The Festival of the Bluegrass, located in Lexington, Kentucky, is the oldest bluegrass music festival in the bluegrass region of Kentucky.  The festival takes place the first full weekend of June each year.  The Festival of the Bluegrass helped shape the early bluegrass festival culture.

The Cornett family of Georgetown, Kentucky, began the festival in 1974 with The Festival of the Bluegrass, which was named by Raymond K. McLain. The first festival stage was a farm wagon with a tarp for shelter. The fans also used a tarp as shelter from the terrible thunderstorms the first day of the festival.  This first festival was held on Walnut Hall Farm, part of which is now the Kentucky Horse Park just on the north side of Lexington. Later the festival was moved to Masterson Station Park, a Lexington city park, for initially two years. However, the festival did not move back to the Horse Park until the seventeenth year, by which time the Horse Park was fully developed with a suitable campground.  The annual event is a traditional bluegrass festival dedicated to preserving bluegrass music.

Since 1998, the festival consists of three stages of music and incorporates a music camp designed to teach bluegrass music to school-age children.  In 2007 the festival received the International Bluegrass Music Association's Event of the Year award.

In 2013, the weekend Festival of the Bluegrass will be following up a weeklong celebration in Lexington, "Best of Bluegrass".

See also
List of bluegrass music festivals
List of country music festivals

References

External links 
Festival of the Bluegrass website

Folk festivals in the United States
Bluegrass festivals
Music festivals in Kentucky
Music festivals established in 1974